Ilse Hornung, later Bietak (10 April 1908 – March 1994) was an Austrian figure skater who competed in ladies' singles. She finished eighth at the 1928 Winter Olympics and won the silver medal at the 1930 European Championships. She was the mother of Austrian figure skater Wilhelm Bietak.

Results

References

1908 births
1994 deaths
Austrian female single skaters
Olympic figure skaters of Austria
Figure skaters at the 1928 Winter Olympics
European Figure Skating Championships medalists